Acacia forrestiana, commonly known as Forrest's wattle, is a shrub belonging to the genus Acacia and the subgenus Phyllodineae that is native to Western Australia. The species was listed as vulnerable by the Environment Protection and Biodiversity Conservation Act 1999 in 2008.

Description
The ascending to erect phyllodes are crowded on the branchlets. It produces yellow flowers from November to December. One simple inflorescence is found per axil supported by a  peduncle. The spherical flower head contain 15 to 20 pale yellow flowers.

Taxonomy
The species was first formally described in 1904 by the botanist Ernst Georg Pritzel as part of the work between Pritzel and Ludwig Diels Fragmenta Phytographiae Australiae occidentalis. Beitrage zur Kenntnis der Pflanzen Westaustraliens, ihrer Verbreitung und ihrer Lebensverhaltnisse as published in Botanische Jahrbücher für Systematik, Pflanzengeschichte und Pflanzengeographie. It was reclassified as Racosperma forrestianum in 2003 by Leslie Pedley then transferred back to the genus Acacia in 2006.

A. forrestiana is closely related to Acacia huegelii which is found further south.

The type specimen was collected by Ludwig Diels near Dandaragan in 1901.

Distribution
It is endemic to a small area on the west coast area in the Wheatbelt region of Western Australia between Coorow and Dandaraganwhere it is found on hills, breakaways and in gullies growing in gravelly clay loam soils over laterite or sandstone. It is often part of heath or low woodland communities composed of an overstorey of Eucalyptus wandoo and Eucalyptus calophylla with understorey scrub including Hakea lissocarpha and other species of Grevillea, Acacia, Isopogon, Calothamnus and Melaleuca.

See also
 List of Acacia species

References

forrestiana
Acacias of Western Australia
Taxa named by Ernst Pritzel
Plants described in 1904